Sil is a fictional alien from the television series Doctor Who, first appeared in the 1985 serial Vengeance on Varos. Sil was portrayed by Nabil Shaban.

Overview
Sil was the representative of the Galatron Mining Corporation present on the planet Varos to extract concessions from the current Governor. Unbeknownst to the Varosians, the mineral Zeiton-7 which was abundant on their planet was not as they thought nearly valueless, but in fact rare, particularly to time travellers. The Varosians lived barely above the poverty line due to the exploitation of companies like the Galatron Mining Corporation and others.

Sil was a particularly vile creature by any standard, more so since a fault in his translation device made his voice sibilant, with a ululating laugh. Devoid of morality and dedicated to getting the cheapest price he could for Zeiton ore by any means, he also enjoyed the various tortures which passed for entertainment on Varos, taking particular delight in making the Sixth Doctor's companion Peri suffer a transformation into an avian creature. The Doctor interfered with Sil's plan and informed the Varosians of the true value of their natural resources, forcing Sil to concede to offer the true value of the Zeiton-7.

The Sixth Doctor and Peri encountered Sil once again on the planet Thoros Beta, where he was that time involved in arms dealing. At the end of the segment of evidence presented by the Valeyard in the Doctor's trial, it appeared that Sil was killed by a rampaging King Yrcanos. It later transpired that the evidence of the Matrix had been tampered with, so it is not clear whether Sil in fact survived.

Other appearances
Sil also features in the Philip Martin's novelisation of the never-made serial Mission to Magnus, in which he was in league with the Ice Warriors.  Big Finish Productions released a new audio version of Mission to Magnus in December 2009, with Nabil Shaban reprising his role as Sil. Sil made another appearance in the Big Finish Audio story Antidote to Oblivion in 2014 alongside the Sixth Doctor and Flip. A script was pitched for the never-produced Season 27 where he would return along with the Autons and UNIT.

In early 2019, Reeltime Pictures announced Nabil Shaban would reprise his role as Sil in a new film, entitled Sil and the Devil Seeds of Arodor. Also starring Sophie Aldred, the production was released as DVD, Download, Stream and Blu-ray.

List of appearances

Television
Vengeance on Varos — January 19–26, 1985
The Trial of a Time Lord: Mindwarp — October 4–25, 1986

Audio
Mission to Magnus (2009)
Antidote to Oblivion (2014)
The Widow’s Assassin (2014)

Web/Home Entertainment
Sil and the Devil Seeds of Arodor — November, 2019''

References

External links

Television characters introduced in 1985
Sil
Doctor Who aliens
Male characters in television